Lagadapati is an Indian surname. Notable people with the surname include:

 Madhusudhan Rao Lagadapati (born 1966), businessman
 Lagadapati Rajagopal, Member of Parliament of India
 Lagadapati Sridhar, vice-chairman of Lanco Infratech
 Gopichand Lagadapati, actor, writer, director and producer

Indian surnames